The Greatest Question is a 1919 American drama film directed by D. W. Griffith. Based upon a novel by William Hale, the film has a plot involving spiritualism.

Plot
As described in a film magazine, Nellie Jarvis (Gish), daughter of a wandering couple, when very young witnesses the murder of a woman by a man and his wife. Years later, "Little Miss Yes'm," as Nellie is known, returns to the scene of the crime as an orphan. Mr. Hilton (Fawcett) and his wife (Besserer), though poverty stricken, take her into their family. Finding the Hiltons are in financial straits, she goes to a nearby farmhouse and gets employment from Martin Cain (Nichols) and his wife (Crowell). Here she is persecuted, beaten and tormented. The farmer seeks to assault her and she recognizes in him the man who murdered the woman years before. In the meantime, Mrs. Hilton has appealed to her dead son and God to relieve the family from poverty. The spirit of the dead son returns and on the following day oil is found on the land. Jimmie Hilton (Harron), Little Miss Yes'm's sweetheart, rushes to the Cain's to get her. He reaches her in time to save her from torture by the depraved Cains. The Hiltons become wealthy and there is a happy ending.

Cast
 Lillian Gish as Nellie Jarvis
 Robert Harron as Jimmie Hilton
 Ralph Graves as John Hilton Jr.
 Eugenie Besserer as Mrs. Hilton
 George Fawcett as Mr. Hilton
 Tom Wilson as Uncle Zeke (*in blackface)
 George Nichols as Martin Cain
 Josephine Crowell as Mrs. Cain

References

External links

1919 films
1919 drama films
Silent American drama films
American silent feature films
American black-and-white films
Articles containing video clips
Films directed by D. W. Griffith
Films with screenplays by Stanner E.V. Taylor
1910s American films